Annika Langvad (born 22 March 1984) is a Danish former racing cyclist, who rode for Specialized Racing in cross-country mountain bike racing. Langvad is a five-time World Champion in mountain bike racing, winning four titles in mountain bike marathon and one in cross-country.

Career
From 2014, Langvad and her Swiss Spur-Specialized teammate Ariane Kleinhans won the women's category of Absa Cape Epic three consecutive times. In 2015, they won by a significant margin of an hour and 18 minutes. Langvad won the Cape Epic a total of five times during her career. Also in 2015, Langvad won the Leadville 100, becoming the first woman to ride that race under 7 hours. In 2016, Langvad won the world championship in Women's cross-country and also placed second in the UCI World Cup rankings for Cross Country, only 24 points behind the leader, Catharine Pendrel. She went on to finish as runner-up in the cross-country World Cup standings a second time in 2018. On the road, she won the Danish road race championship in 2010, was a three-time Danish time trial champion, and finished sixth in the 2013 individual time trial World Championship. On 9 October 2020, she announced her retirement.

Major results

Cyclo-cross
2010–2011
 1st  National Championships
2013–2014
 1st  National Championships
2014–2015
 1st  National Championships
 3rd Kronborg

Road

2010
 National Road Championships
1st  Road race
1st  Time trial
2011
 1st  Time trial, National Road Championships
2013
 1st  Time trial, National Road Championships
 6th Time trial, UCI Road World Championships
2018
 3rd Time trial, National Road Championships
2019
 2nd Strade Bianche
 3rd La Flèche Wallonne
 4th Amstel Gold Race

Mountain Bike

2009
 1st  Cross-country, National Championships
2010
 1st  Cross-country, National Championships
 3rd  Marathon, UCI World Championships
2011
 1st  Marathon, UCI World Championships
 1st  Cross-country, National Championships
2012
 1st  Marathon, UCI World Championships
 1st  Cross-country, National Championships
2013
 1st  Cross-country, National Championships
2014
 1st  Marathon, UCI World Championships
 1st  Cross-country, National Championships
 1st  Overall Cape Epic (with Ariane Lüthi)
 1st  Overall Swiss Epic (with Ariane Kleinhans)
 UCI XCO World Cup
3rd Windham
2015
 1st  Cross-country, National Championships
 1st  Overall Cape Epic (with Ariane Lüthi)
 2nd  Marathon, UCI World Championships
 2nd Overall Swiss Epic (with Ariane Lüthi)
 3rd Overall UCI XCO World Cup
1st Val di Sole
3rd Windham
2016
 1st  Cross-country, UCI World Championships
 1st  Cross-country, National Championships
 1st  Overall Cape Epic (with Ariane Lüthi)
 1st Roc d'Azur
 2nd Overall UCI XCO World Cup
1st Cairns
1st Albstadt
2nd Lenzerheide
2017
 1st  Marathon, UCI World Championships
 1st  Cross-country, National Championships
 2nd Overall UCI XCO World Cup
1st Nové Město
2nd Vallnord
 UCI Marathon Series
1st Attakwas Extreme
1st Roc d'Azur
2018
 1st  Marathon, UCI World Championships
 1st  Cross-country, National Championships
 1st  Marathon, National Championships
 1st  Overall Cape Epic (with Kate Courtney)
 2nd  Cross-country, UCI World Championships
 2nd Overall UCI XCO World Cup
1st Stellenbosch
1st Nové Město
2nd Mont-Sainte-Anne
3rd La Bresse
 UCI XCC World Cup
1st Albstadt
1st Nové Město
1st Val di Sole
1st Mont-Sainte-Anne
1st La Bresse
2nd Vallnord
2019
 1st  Overall Cape Epic (with Anna van der Breggen)
2020
 1st  Cross-country, National Championships
 1st  Marathon, National Championships
 1st  Overall Swiss Epic (with Haley Batten)

References

External links

Annika Langvad at MTBCrossCountry.com

Danish mountain bikers
Danish female cyclists
Living people
1984 births
UCI Mountain Bike World Champions (women)
People from Silkeborg
Cross-country mountain bikers
Olympic cyclists of Denmark
Cyclists at the 2016 Summer Olympics
Sportspeople from the Central Denmark Region
21st-century Danish women